The Biotechnology Journal is a peer-reviewed scientific journal covering all aspects of biotechnology.

Abstracting and indexing 
The journal is abstracted and indexed in:

According to the Journal Citation Reports, the journal has a 2012 impact factor of 3.446.

References

External links 
 

Wiley-Blackwell academic journals
Biotechnology journals
English-language journals
Publications established in 2006
Monthly journals